The 2009 AFC Champions League was the 28th edition of the top-level Asian club football tournament organized by the Asian Football Confederation (AFC), and the 7th under the current AFC Champions League title. The final was held at the National Stadium in Tokyo on 7 November 2009. The winners, South Korean club Pohang Steelers, qualified for the 2009 FIFA Club World Cup in the United Arab Emirates.

The champions league was expanded to 35 clubs this year, with 5 teams starting from a knockout qualifying stage. An extra stage in the knockout phase was added so that the runners up as well as the winners from the group stage would progress.  The previous season winner no longer got a bye through to the knockout round. Each team was allowed to field a maximum of four foreign players this season, one of whom had to be from an AFC Member Association country.

Qualification
A total of 35 teams participated in the 2009 AFC Champions League.

AFC assessment ranking

† One of the A-League clubs, Wellington Phoenix, is based in New Zealand, an OFC member country, therefore not being eligible to compete in the ACL.

Allocation of entries

Below is the qualification scheme for the 2009 AFC Champions League:

Qualifying play-off: (5 teams)
 United Arab Emirates,  Indonesia,  Singapore,  Thailand,  India each have 1 team qualify
Group stage: (32 teams)
2 qualifying play-off entries
4 teams qualified:  Japan,  China,  Iran,  South Korea,  Saudi Arabia
3 teams qualified:  United Arab Emirates
2 teams qualified:  Australia,  Uzbekistan,  Qatar 
1 team qualified:  Indonesia

The following teams had qualified for qualifying play-off, but were removed as their leagues did not meet the Champions League criteria:

Teams
In the following table, the number of appearances and last appearance count only those since the 2002–03 season (including qualifying rounds), when the competition was rebranded as the AFC Champions League. TH means title holders.

 Number of appearances (including qualifying rounds) since the 2002/03 season, when the competition was rebranded as the AFC Champions League

Schedule

Qualifying play-off

Preliminary round

Play-off round

Group stage

The draw for the group stage was held on 7 January 2009 in Abu Dhabi, UAE.

Each club played double round-robin (home and away) against fellow three group members, a total of 6 matches each. Each team had been numbered from 1 to 4, the numbers determine the order of the fixtures.
Match Day 1: 1 vs 4, 3 vs 2
Match Day 2: 2 vs 1, 4 vs 3
Match Day 3: 1 vs 3, 4 vs 2
Match Day 4: 3 vs 1, 2 vs 4
Match Day 5: 4 vs 1, 2 vs 3
Match Day 6: 1 vs 2, 3 vs 4

Clubs receive 3 points for a win, 1 point for a tie, 0 points for a loss. The clubs are ranked according to points and tie breakers are in following order: 
Greater number of points obtained in the group matches between the teams concerned;
Goal difference resulting from the group matches between the teams concerned; (Away goals do not apply)
Greater number of goals scored in the group matches between the teams concerned; (Away goals do not apply)
Goal difference in all the group matches;
Greater number of goals scored in all the group matches;
Kicks from the penalty mark if only two teams are involved and they are both on the field of play;
Fewer score calculated according to the number of yellow and red cards received in the group matches; (1 point for each yellow card, 3 points for each red card as a consequence of two yellow cards, 3 points for each direct red card, 4 points for each yellow card followed by a direct red card)
Drawing of lots.

Winners and runners-up of each group qualified for the next round.

Group A

Group B

Group C

Group D

Group E

Group F

Group G

Group H

Knockout stage

Bracket

Round of 16
The draw for the round of 16 of the 2009 AFC Champions League was held on 7 January 2009, along with the draw for the group stage. The West Asian matches were played on 26 and 27 May. The East Asian matches were played on 24 June.

Quarter-finals
The draw for the quarter-finals and the remaining knockout rounds took place at Kuala Lumpur, Malaysia on 29 June 2009. The first leg matches were played on 23–24 September, with the second leg matches were played on 30 September.

Semi-finals
The first leg matches were played on 21 October, with the second leg matches were played on 28 October 2009.

Final

The 2009 AFC Champions League Final was played on 7 November at National Stadium, Tokyo, Japan.

Top scorers
Note: Goals scored in qualifying round not counted.

Fair Play Award
 Pohang Steelers

See also
2009 AFC Champions League Final
2009 FIFA Club World Cup

References

External links
AFC Champions League Official Page 

 
2009
1